Discrete may refer to:
Discrete particle or quantum in physics, for example in quantum theory
Discrete device, an electronic component with just one circuit element, either passive or active, other than an integrated circuit
Discrete group, a group with the discrete topology
Discrete category, category whose only arrows are identity arrows
Discrete mathematics, the study of structures without continuity
Discrete optimization, a branch of optimization in applied mathematics and computer science
Discrete probability distribution, a random variable that can be counted
Discrete space, a simple example of a topological space
Discrete spline interpolation, the discrete analog of ordinary spline  interpolation
Discrete time, non-continuous time, which results in discrete-time samples
Discrete variable, non-continuous variable
Discrete pitch, a pitch with a steady frequency, rather than an indiscrete gliding, glissando or portamento, pitch